Drobeta is a genus of moths of the family Noctuidae, named after ancient Drobeta.

Drobeta can also refer to:
 Drobeta-Turnu Severin, a city in Romania; had Dacian and Roman precursors both named Drobeta
 Drobeta (castra), Roman fortified place at the site
 Coat of arms of Drobeta-Turnu Severin
 FC Drobeta, a Romanian professional football club from Drobeta-Turnu Severin
 CS Gaz Metan Drobeta-Turnu Severin
 Stadionul Municipal (Drobeta-Turnu Severin), city stadium
 Port of Drobeta Turnu Severin